Richard Rowett was a British businessman and member of the Legislative Council of Hong Kong.

Rowett was part of the Holiday, Wise & Co., a British opium firm. He was appointed member of the Legislative Council of Hong Kong in August 1869 during the absence of Henry John Ball, Judge of the Court of the Summary Jurisdiction sat as an unofficial. He was appointed again to replace Hugh Bold Gibb on 22 May 1871 who resigned from the Legislative Council. He retired from the Holiday, Wise & Co. on 31 December 1874.

References

British expatriates in Hong Kong
Hong Kong businesspeople
Chairmen of HSBC
Members of the Legislative Council of Hong Kong